John Serle (died c. 1456), of Southampton, was an English Member of Parliament for Portsmouth in 1419.

References

Year of birth missing
1456 deaths
English MPs 1419
Members of the Parliament of England (pre-1707) for Portsmouth
Politicians from Southampton